Port is a part of the Szczecin City, Poland situated on the islands between the West Oder river and East Oder River (Regalica), east of the Szczecin Old Town, and west of Szczecin-Dąbie.

Port